Elizabeth McCullough Johnson (1909–1973) was an American politician. She served as a Democratic member of the Florida House of Representatives and Florida Senate for nearly a decade. Johnson became the first female state senator in Florida history upon her election in 1962. She had previously become the second woman elected to the Florida House, when she was chosen to represent Orange County in 1958.

Johnson was a leading advocate, along with former State Senate President William A. Shands for the establishment of the University of Central Florida in 1963. She considered it, along with the creation of a statewide planning and zoning system, as her chief legislative accomplishments. Johnson was a member of the League of Women Voters, and was posthumously inducted into the Florida Women's Hall of Fame in 1986.

Senator Beth Johnson Park, a  urban park located near Lake Ivanhoe in Orlando is named in her honor.

After her death in 1973 her remains were interred at Woodlawn Memorial Park in Orange County, Florida.

References
General:
 James, Randall. "Morphing Orlando: Into a World-Class City" (2013), 
 Weatherford, Doris. Women in American Politics: History and Milestones (2012), 

Notes:

In-text:

1909 births
1973 deaths
Democratic Party members of the Florida House of Representatives
Democratic Party Florida state senators
Women state legislators in Florida
People from Pennsylvania
People from Orange County, Florida
20th-century American politicians
20th-century American women politicians